Münster is a city in North Rhine-Westphalia, Germany, where the Peace of Westphalia was signed.

Münster or Muenster may also refer to:

Places 
 Münster, Tyrol, a town in the district of Kufstein in Austria
 Muenster, Saskatchewan, a village in central Saskatchewan, Canada
 Munster, Haut-Rhin, a commune in the Haut-Rhin department, France
 Munster, a province in Ireland

Germany
 Münster (electoral district)
 Münster (region), a Regierungsbezirk of North Rhine-Westphalia, surrounding the city of Münster
 Prince-Bishopric of Münster, a former state of the Holy Roman Empire
 Roman Catholic Diocese of Münster, a bishopric
 Münster, Hesse, a village in Germany
 Münster, Bavaria, a town in the district of Donau-Ries
 FH Münster, a German university in Münster and Steinfurt
 Neumünster, a town in Schleswig-Holstein, Germany
 University of Münster

Switzerland
 Münster (Bern), a Swiss Reformed cathedral in Bern
 Münster, Valais, a village
 Münster-Geschinen, a former municipality
 Münster, the German name of Moutier, canton of Bern
 Münster or Müstair, a village in Val Müstair, Inn, Graubünden

United States
 Munster, Illinois
 Munster, Indiana
 Muenster, Texas

Other uses 
 Münster (surname), German-language surname
 Münster (cathedral), an honorific title given to particular churches in England
 Munster cheese, a French cheese
 Muenster cheese, an American cheese
 Treaty of Münster (disambiguation), two treaties signed in 1648

See also
 
 Munster (disambiguation)
 Münsterland Giro, a bicycle race
 Münsterländer (disambiguation), two breeds of dog
 Münsterlingen, a village in the canton of Thurgau, Switzerland
 Münstertal, Black Forest, a village in Germany
 Bad Münstereifel, a spa town in the Eifel region of Germany
 Beromünster, Luzern